Empetrichthyinae is a subfamily of fishes, one of two subfamilies that make up the family Goodeidae.

Genera
There are two genera within the subfamily Empetrichthyinae:

 Crenichthys Hubbs, 1932
 Empetrichthys Gilbert, 1893

References

 
Goodeidae